Jesús Aarón Soto Sánchez (born 2 July 1985) is a Mexican former football goalkeeper who played for Chiapas reserve team. He also played for Guerreros and Petroleros de Salamanca in the Liga de Ascenso.

Soto is the goalkeeping coach for Atletico Chiapas.

References

External links
 Jesús Aarón Soto at BDFA.com.ar 
 Profile at Univision
 

1985 births
Living people
Mexican footballers
Association football goalkeepers
Salamanca F.C. footballers
Chiapas F.C. footballers
Guerreros de Hermosillo F.C. footballers
Ascenso MX players